The black snake-eyed skink (Cryptoblepharus ater) is a species of lizard in the family Scincidae. It is endemic to the Comoro Islands.

References

Cryptoblepharus
Reptiles described in 1913
Taxa named by Oskar Boettger